Samangad is a hill fort in Kolhapur District, Maharashtra. The fort is situated on the oval-shaped top of the hill. The eight-foot-high wall of the fort which encircled the hill top is still intact. Earlier several cisterns cut out of the rock ensured a plentiful supply of water to the fort but by 1957 most of them were in ruins.

The Samangad grant, which belongs to the seventh Rashtrakuta king Dantidurga or Dantivarma II, bears the date sak 675 (A.D. 733–54).

In 1676, the fortifications were considerably improved by Shivaji, subsequent to which it was known as one of the "smallest yet strongest forts" of the great Marathas. In 1844, the Samangad garrison rebelled and took over the fort, shutting the gates. But it was stormed by the British Raj under a General Delamotte and retaken from the rebelling soldiers. The British Raj dismantled the fort and it has been in ruins ever since.

This fort is a tomb of famous warrior Shri Prataprao Gujar who fought against the Adil Shahi army of Bahalul Khan with only six soldiers. Stories are told by local from generation to generation.

The fort is surrounded by trees; it is developed by the government of Maharashtra as a tourist place. Also Maruti temple and Chaloba temple near fort is visited by devotees. A village near fort is Naukud, Hasursasgiri and Chinchewadi which is a rural area. Gun fire weapons at Naukud found and kept near Vithoba temple. 

The other most important attraction over here is  BHUI BHANGARA which means cracked land. It is actually temple of lord shiva under the crevices of rock and has got stairs to climb down. there are statues of many deities like DATTATRAY, SHANI and GANESHA. It has got long corridor there is belief among the natives here that there is a hidden tunnel from fort till here for escaping. Also the MARUTI temple near to this was built by SAMARTH RAMDAS SWAMI.The BHIMSHAPPA MATH is another prominent destination it is the shrine of local saint BHIMSHAPPA who attained nirvana here. A small village got its name BHIMSASGIRI from this saint which is later known to be HASURSASGIRI. 

The spoken language around this fort is Marathi. People around this fort celebrate Samangad fair on the first Wednesday after Shivratri which is in February or March every year. During this time they perform lot of events including bullock cart race, horse cart race, bicycle race, entertainment during night time and much more.

References 

Forts in Maharashtra
Tourist attractions in Kolhapur district